Rajesh Verma (11 December 1981 – 24 April 2022) was an Indian first-class cricketer who played for Mumbai. He made his first-class debut for Mumbai in 2002.

References

External links
 

1981 births
2022 deaths
Indian cricketers
Mumbai cricketers